Leonor de Castro Mello y Meneses (born 1512; died 27 March 1546 in Gandía) was a Portuguese noble and court official, the IVth Duchess of Gandia, and the lady-in-waiting and close friend of the Empress regent Isabella of Portugal.

Life
She was daughter of Álvaro de Castro "the Old", Captain-general of Africa of King Manuel I of Portugal, and wife Isabel de Mello Barreto e Meneses. Her brother, Rodrigo de Castro, was governor of the Portuguese seat of Safí (Morocco).

In 1526, she was appointed Camarera mayor de Palacio to empress Isabella of Portugal, queen of Spain (mother of Philip II of Spain) and regent of Spain during the absence of her spouse the emperor. Leonor de Castro was to become not only her lady-in-waiting but also her personal friend and confidant. 

During 1529 the negotiations took place to resolve her marriage with Francis de Borja. The emperor Carlos I of Spain, represented by his majordomo Pedro González de Mendoza, negotiating in the name of Leonor, urging the Duke of Gandía to accept her conditions. After agreeing to marriage, the spouses met in Toledo in August, and the wedding with Francis Borja took place in the Royal Alcazar of Madrid in 1529. They had eight children: Carlos in 1530, Isabel in 1532, Juan in 1533, Álvaro in 1535, Juana Francisca in 1535, Fernando in 1537, Dorotea in 1538 and Alonso in 1539.

In 1539, she and her husband attended the burial of the former regent empress Isabella in Granada.

She passed her last days in the Monastery of Sant Jeroni de Cotalba, very near to Gandia, recovering from her ailments, where she died on 27 March 1546. At the death of Leonor de Castro, her husband, Francis Borja, saddened, resigned his goods and possessions in favor of his children, yielded the nobility titles and went to Rome, where in June, 1546, he would enter in the Society of Jesus.

See also 
 House of Borgia
 Route of the Borgias

References

Bibliography 
Sebastián Lozano, Jorge (2011): San Francisco de Borja, Grande de España, Arte y espiritualidad en la cultura de los siglos XVI y XVII. pp. 67–90.

External links 
 Information about Francis de Borgia 

1512 births
1546 deaths
Leonor
16th-century Spanish people
Viceroys of Catalonia
Duchesses of Gandia
Monastery of Sant Jeroni de Cotalba
Spanish ladies-in-waiting